North Shore is a Canadian short documentary film, directed by Pierre Petel and released in 1949. The film depicts life along the St. Lawrence River in the Côte-Nord region of Quebec.

The film was released in both French and English versions, with French narration by René Lecavalier and English narration by Fred Davis and Max Ferguson.

The film won the Canadian Film Award for Best Theatrical Short in 1950. Petel also won an award from the Montreal Museum of Fine Arts for "Excursion in the Mingan Islands", a painting of rock formations in the Mingan Islands that he created while working on the film.

References

External links

North Shore at the National Film Board of Canada

1949 films
Canadian short documentary films
Quebec films
Best Theatrical Short Film Genie and Canadian Screen Award winners
1949 documentary films
Canadian black-and-white films
1940s Canadian films
1940s short documentary films